The Tenerife Arts Space (TEA) is a cultural space and building in Santa Cruz de Tenerife, Tenerife, Spain. Opened in 2008, it was designed by Herzog & de Meuron and Virgilio Gutierrez. It houses a permanent exhibition of the works of Óscar Domínguez, as well as the Biblioteca Municipal de Santa Cruz de Tenerife, and the Centro de Fotografía Isla de Tenerife. It is operated by the Cabildo de Tenerife.

Location 
TEA is located in Santa Cruz's old town, adjacent to the Santos ravine. It is next to the Museo de la Naturaleza y Arqueología, near to the Nuestra Señora de Africa market and the Iglesia de la Concepción (Church of the Conception).

Building 
The building was designed by the Swiss firm of architects Herzog & de Meuron and the Canary architect Virgilio Gutierrez. It is made of concrete, with 1,200 glass windows with 720 different sizes and shapes. A ramp leads to a central courtyard, surrounded by different parts of the building. The building opened on 31 October 2008.

Contents 
The building houses a permanent exhibition of work by the Tenerife artist Óscar Domínguez. It also houses the Biblioteca Municipal de Santa Cruz de Tenerife, and the Centro de Fotografía Isla de Tenerife (Center for Photography Island of Tenerife). It is operated by the Cabildo de Tenerife.

References 

Museums in Tenerife
Buildings and structures in Santa Cruz de Tenerife
Art museums and galleries in Spain
Herzog & de Meuron buildings